Pramodh Kumara (born 20 July 1995) is a Sri Lankan cricketer. He made his Twenty20 debut on 4 January 2020, for Sri Lanka Air Force Sports Club in the 2019–20 SLC Twenty20 Tournament. He made his first-class debut on 31 January 2020, for Sri Lanka Air Force Sports Club in Tier B of the 2019–20 Premier League Tournament.

References

External links
 

1995 births
Living people
Sri Lankan cricketers
Sri Lanka Air Force Sports Club cricketers